Zir Deh may refer to:
 Zir Deh, Astaneh-ye Ashrafiyeh, Gilan Province
 Zir Deh, Rasht, Gilan Province
 Zir Deh, Kohgiluyeh and Boyer-Ahmad